Discrimination against superheroes is a common theme and plot element comic books and superhero fiction, usually as a way to explore the issue of superheroes operating in society or as commentary on other social concerns. Often in response to this are Registration Acts, fictional legislative bills that have been plot points used in various comic books and mediums which, when passed into law, enforce the regulation of extra-legal vigilante activity vs. criminal activity, or the mandatory registration of superpowered individuals with the government.

The issues that superheroes may be discriminated against, and that the government might seek to regulate the activities and civil rights of superheroes, who are either criminalized or deemed to be a threat to the safety of the general public, who may be denied habeas corpus or detained indefinitely without trial, or viewed as valuable national security resource subject to forced conscription without notice in times of crisis, have also been explored in other comics, such as those featuring DC's Justice Society of America team, series like Watchmen, Astro City, and Powers; the films The Return of Captain Invincible (1983) and The Incredibles (2004); and in role-playing games Brave New World (1999), and Dawn of Legends for Savage Worlds.

This kind of plot point is especially rich and extensively explored in the fictional universes of various comic book stories that are published by Marvel Comics. The first mention of the broad concept was in Uncanny X-Men #141 (January 1981). The actual term "Registration Act" was first used in Uncanny X-Men #181 (May 1984). As their names suggest, Mutant Registration Act and Superhuman Registration Act deal with the registration of mutants and superhumans respectively. The Mutant Registration Act has also been featured in both the original X-Men animated series and the X-Men films. Numerous versions of each bill have been proposed at different times and in different jurisdictions in the Marvel Universe. The Superhuman Registration Act is a major plot point in Marvel's 2006 crossover limited series Civil War, which was loosely adapted for the Marvel Cinematic Universe (MCU) in Captain America: Civil War (2016). This version was called the Sokovia Accords. The Accords were mentioned in Spider-Man: Homecoming (2017). The Accords would have a lasting impact in the films Avengers: Infinity War (2018), Ant-Man and the Wasp (2018), and the series WandaVision (2021) before their repeal was revealed in She-Hulk: Attorney at Law (2022).

The Registration Acts as a concept

Publication history
The idea that enhanced individuals might need to be "regulated" or "registered" by the government was first raised in specific relation to Marvel Comics' mutants. In Uncanny X-Men #141, (written by Chris Claremont and John Byrne) the concept is briefly suggested. In that issue the term "Registration Act" is not used, but one character (Moira MacTaggert) brings up the notion of "registration". In reference to a politician whom she suspects of anti-mutant bigotry she says:

"Registration today, gas chambers tomorrow".

The same issue features mention of the "Mutant Control Act", however it is left unclear exactly what that legislation involves and whether some form of registration is a part of it. However, in New Mutants #1, it was implied that involved the operation of concentration camps.

The term "Mutant Registration Act" was first fully used in Uncanny X-Men #181, by writer Chris Claremont. As the MRA (as it became known) was passed into law in the Marvel Universe it became widely used as a subplot, plot device or background element across Marvel's entire line of titles, especially those featuring mutants (such as Uncanny X-Men, X-Factor and New Mutants) during the late 1980s.

In the early 1990s Chris Claremont left the X-titles and the topic of the MRA began to appear much more rarely in stories. It was still occasionally mentioned, though usually in the past tense, suggesting that it was repealed at some point (though this was never clearly shown) or that it simply ceased to be actively enforced.

However, in an interview regarding the Civil War: X-Men limited series its writer David Hine suggested that it is still law in the Marvel Universe, stating that in the series the idea of bringing  "the Mutant Registration Act in line with the SRA" will be discussed.

The idea of an equivalent piece of legislation for non-mutant super-powered individuals—a Superhuman Registration Act—was first raised in comics that were published during the "Acts of Vengeance" crossover in 1989–1990. The issue was most fully explored in Fantastic Four #335-336 by writer Walter Simonson. In the course of the story, the issue was apparently resolved with the proposed Act being shelved.

The concept was then revived in 1993 in Alpha Flight (vol. 1) #120 (May 1993) by writer Simon Furman. In that issue a "Superpowers Registration Act" becomes law in Canada and went on to be a major plot point in the remainder of the series. However, later Alpha Flight series did not make use of the concept.

In 2006 the concept was again revived by writer Mark Millar as the main plot point in Marvel's 2006 Civil War crossover. In preparation for that storyline a new version of  the Superhuman Registration Act has been widely mentioned across various Marvel titles, with the issue being most widely discussed and explored in The Amazing Spider-Man #529 - 531 (April - June 2006) by writer J. Michael Straczynski.

Issues, allegories and metaphors
When the topic of the original Superhuman Registration Act is debated in Fantastic Four #335-336 the issue is explored in a national security context, with the utility of such a law being challenged. In the comics the Fantastic Four argue that super-heroes are already a hugely benevolent force for society and such an act would be unnecessary and possibly counter-productive. The National Rifle Association (NRA) is also against the act, stating that the Second Amendment to the United States Constitution's protection of the right to keep and bear arms in the United States applies to superpowers. An NRA representative testifies to Congress that "if powers are outlawed, only outlaws will have powers".

When the issue of an SRA was raised again in Amazing Spider-Man #529 - 531 the prospect of a new SRA is explored once more from a security perspective, with reference being made to the fact that super-powered individuals often wield abilities which have massively destructive potential for use, making some mechanism to regulate their activities necessary.

The writer of Civil War, Mark Millar, has stated that that storyline explores the civil rights implications of the SHR as previous stories have done, but also explores the other side of the argument in more depth, in particular how Marvel super-heroes are, absent an SRA, illegal vigilantes, lacking proper legal authority or oversight.

Terms of the registration acts
In a June 2006 interview Civil War editor Tom Brevoort  confirmed that registrants to the act were required to reveal their identities to the government (but not the public) and they have to undergo some basic testing or training and satisfy certain (as yet unspecified) standards before they gain legal authorization to continue to use their abilities to fight crime. Government employment is not mandatory, though it is available to those who wish to take it. This has not remained consistent, though, and characters have made reference to all superpowered individuals being forced to register and enlist in S.H.I.E.L.D.

It was revealed in Amazing Spider-Man #535 that unregistered individuals are sent to a prison in the otherdimensional Negative Zone indefinitely until they agree to register. Iron Man claims that as this is off United States soil, they have almost no civil rights unless the United States Supreme Court explicitly rules otherwise—and he knows they won't. This leads Spider-Man to re-evaluate his support of the act. After the major conflict of Civil War ends, all the superhero inmates are transferred to real prisons in the state while the facility is transformed into a Maximum Security Prison for high-threat-level villains such as the Taskmaster and Lady Deathstrike.

Marvel Universe

Marvel Comics

Mutant Control Act
The first direct mention of a piece of legislation specifically aimed at super-humans in the Marvel Universe comes in Uncanny X-Men #141 (January 1981), in which the "Mutant Control Act", a law from the future, is mentioned. In this issue (the first part of the two-part "Days of Future Past" storyline), the consciousness of Kate Pryde travels back in time from a dystopian future to the present, possessing the body of her younger self, X-Men member Kitty Pryde. Upon revealing herself to Kitty's teammates, she recounts to them the series of events which led to her dark present/their future, in the hopes the X-Men can prevent these historical events from ever happening. One of those pivotal events was the passing of a "Mutant Control Act" by the U.S. government. When the U.S. Supreme Court strikes down the law for being unconstitutional, the other branches of the government respond by reactivating the Sentinel program, and its mutant-hunting robots, to police mutants. However, this plan backfires when the artificial intelligence-enabled Sentinels determine that the best way to stop mutants is to control all people (since any non-mutant, at any level of society, could eventually become a politically powerful mutant ally advancing pro-mutant ideas and laws); the Sentinels forcibly take over the U.S. government and institute a harsh regime which includes severe mutant persecution. The reference to the Mutant Control Act is brief, and it is unclear exactly what its provisions would entail, though it would appear that registration forms at least one part of it. In the course of the story, the X-Men successfully prevent one of the pivotal events Pryde had described to them (the assassination of U.S. Senator Robert Kelly) from occurring; however, the story's ending is intentionally ambiguous as to whether Pryde's dystopian future was fully avoided. Although no Mutant Control Act has been implemented in the comics, the Mutant Registration Act may be its equivalent, and the events of "Days of Future Past" continue to be alluded to in X-Men comics as a possible future.

1982 British Super Hero Legislation
During the events of the Jaspers' Warp story arc, an insane reality warper, Jim Jaspers, became the Prime Minister of the United Kingdom and turned the UK into a fascist state. As PM, he enforced "Super Hero Legislation"; using armored agents of S.T.R.I.K.E., the UK division of S.H.I.E.L.D., to hunt down and detain superhumans within the UK. However, the legislation is abandoned after Captain Britain defeated Jaspers.

Mutant Registration Act
Registration as a concept is first mentioned in Uncanny X-Men #141 in which Moira MacTaggert suggests that Robert Kelly deems the registration of mutants by the government as necessary.

Her suggestion eventually turns out to be accurate, and in the Uncanny X-Men #181 (May 1984) the first mention of a Mutant Control Act is made when Kelly is seen discussing his introduction of the Mutant Affairs Control Act with a senatorial colleague. It is then mentioned in #183 (1984) to have "stirred up the hornets' nest" (12) by Valerie Cooper. By #184 (July 1984) the Act is mentioned as introduced in Congress by Senator Kelly, and in #188 Nightcrawler remarks the chance of it to become accepted as law is as high as never before, suggesting that, unlike the Mutant Control Act in the "Days of Future Past" timeline, it would not be struck down by the Supreme Court.

The passage of the MRA did not have an immediate impact on the plots of any Marvel series, but the legislation continued to be referenced intermittently in various titles. In at least one instance (X-Factor #1; February 1986), the Act is referred to as a "possible new law". In that story, the prospect of the MRA is one of the things which motivate Jean Grey and Cyclops to form X-Factor.

The legislation becomes a plot point later when government agent Val Cooper and the mutant terrorist Mystique form Freedom Force, a government-sanctioned superhero team (mostly comprising former members of the Brotherhood of Evil Mutants) in Uncanny X-Men #199 (November 1985). Freedom Force went on to make many appearances where they sought to enforce the MRA by arresting unregistered mutants such as members of the X-Men (e.g. Uncanny X-Men #206, June 1986), X-Factor (e.g. X-Factor #30; July 1988) and the New Mutants (e.g. New Mutants #86, February 1990). They also appeared enforcing the MRA in non-X-Men-related titles such as Daredevil #269 (August 1989).

Captain America (who at this point is John Walker, the character who would later be known as U.S. Agent) and Battlestar – two other officially sanctioned super-heroes – also briefly enforce the Act by capturing the unregistered mutant Meteorite for the government in Captain America (vol. 2) #343 (July 1988).

During this period of active enforcement of the MRA, the only mutants who are shown publicly protesting the Act were those who were not aligned with the X-Men or its affiliated teams. For example, in X-Factor #33 the Alliance of Evil demonstrates against the MRA in Manhattan and after fighting X-Factor are arrested by Freedom Force and in Captain America #368 (March 1990) a mutant group called the Resistants are shown protesting the Act in Washington, D.C. Indeed, far from publicly agitating against the act, one X-team (X-Factor, in its original form) actually pretend in public to be supporters of the MRA who are actively enforcing it, though in actuality they act to subvert it.

With Freedom Force (the characters most involved in the enforcement of the Act) no longer existing (they disband following a disastrous mission in Iraq in X-Factor Annual #6, 1991) and Chris Claremont (the writer who developed the MRA as a sub-plot) no longer writing X-Men stories after 1992, the Mutant Registration Act stopped appearing prominently in Marvel Universe stories.

Proposition X
In an attempt to further subjugate the remaining mutant population, Simon Trask leads the Humanity Now! coalition in support of federal legislation called Proposition X. Proposition X if passed would have force mandatory chemical birth control on all mutants. While marching to San Francisco's city hall in support of Proposition X, Simon Trask and his followers met opposition by Hank McCoy, young mutants and mutant right activist. Hank McCoy's peaceful resistance against Proposition X eventually led to a fight between the opposing sides. In response Norman Osborn will declare martial law in San Francisco, which causes the riot that will plague the city the next few nights. These events will lead to Cyclops creating a new mutant sanctuary called Utopia, where mutants can be free from bigoted legislation.

1990 Metahuman Registration Act
A variation on the concept of the Mutant Registration Act the Superhuman Registration Act concept is originally proposed in comic books published circa the "Acts of Vengeance" storyline, such as Punisher (vol. 2) #29 and Avengers (vol. 1) #313 (both January 1990).

During that period, in Fantastic Four #335 and 336 (December 1989, January 1990) the Fantastic Four go to Congress where a committee is investigating whether an SRA, similar in its provisions to the already in effect Mutant Registration Act, is required for Superheroes (the MRA only covers individuals who have their powers inherently at birth, not those who acquire their abilities artificially in later life). In his testimony and in evidence he presents to Congress, Reed Richards argues that a Super-human registration Act is unnecessary as Super-humans have been largely effective and trustworthy in their actions and government regulation would only stifle their ability to protect the world. He argues that those individuals who were likely to act irresponsibly with their powers are also likely to be supervillains and thus would not be candidates for registration anyway.

As the topic is debated, he and his teammates are continually attacked by random supervillains whom they easily subdue, though it is unclear if this helps or hinders his arguments. In his final point concerning the lack of any workable definition of superhuman Richards demonstrates a device that scans a human for physical and mental capabilities and compares those to the national average, marking 'significant outliers' as "superhuman". The device identifies several regular humans, including some committee members, as "superhuman" according to those criteria. The proposed legislation is abandoned and registration of superhumans in the United States is not recommended by the committee.

1993 Canadian Super-powers Registration Act
A similarly titled "Super-powers Registration Act" is passed by the Canadian government in Alpha Flight #120 (May 1993). Introduced by a minister of the Canadian government named Robert Hagon, the Super-powers Registration Act is part of a complex plot engineered by the Master, who is using the alias "Joshua Lord".

The terms of the act entail the government employment of all super-powered individuals, including mutants, who are then enlisted in one of the government Department H "Flight" programs such as "Alpha Flight" and "Gamma Flight".

Although the Act was shown to be controversial and the first series ended with the disbandment of the Canadian government's superteams (the various "Flights") in Alpha Flight (vol. 1) #130 (March 1994), the Canadian SRA is never explicitly repealed or overturned within the comics.

Later Alpha Flight series did not acknowledge the law. As of 2006, rumors began to circulate (encouraged by some Marvel creators such as Mark Millar) that a new Alpha Flight series of some form is in the planning stages. The rumors suggest that the premise of this series would involve American superheroes fleeing the United States to Canada to escape a newly enacted U.S. Superhuman Registration Act. This suggests that registration is no longer mandatory in the Marvel Universe version of Canada. In July 2006 Civil War editor Tom Brevoort concurred with this sentiment saying "we've seen no evidence of it in ten-plus years of Canadian appearances. So if such legislation did exist, it was evidently repealed at some point."

Other sources, however, such as Michael Avon Oeming's post-Civil War title Omega Flight, contradict this statement, which several characters mentioning having a Registration Act for years, without the negative effects of the American Superhuman Registration act.

2006 Superhuman Registration Act

Interest in the concept of the act was revived in various Marvel comic books in 2006. In New Avengers Special: the Illuminati (May 2006), following the events of "Decimation" and the sudden dramatic fall in the Mutant population, the U.S. government again considers a Superhuman Registration Act and Iron Man attempts to persuade his Illuminati colleagues to support the SRA, in order to diffuse it. Iron Man predicts that some superhuman or group of superhumans will eventually make a mistake that will cost hundreds of lives (he specifically mentions the Young Avengers and the Runaways as candidates for causing such a catastrophe). After such an event, he went on to predict, the government would inevitably rush to make an example of someone, or everyone, in the superhuman community by passing legislation that would be even more restrictive or persecutory towards them than the proposed SRA. By supporting the Act before it is passed, he suggests, he and his fellow Illuminati might be able to help avert such possible future tragedies and also, by becoming a part of the process, help moderate the legislation so that it would have the minimum possible negative effect on the superhuman community. However, most of the Illuminati members (except for Reed Richards, who had spoken against the similar proposition made 16 years before (see above)) flatly reject Stark's proposal, leading to the disbandment of the group.

In Amazing Spider-Man #529-531 (April–June 2006), Spider-Man and Iron Man travel to Washington, D.C. to discuss the issue. In those issues Iron Man is shown to be initially opposed to the idea, while Spider-Man is unsure of his opinion. In #531, the first part of Iron Man's prediction are shown to be accurate when a conflict between the New Warriors and a group of supervillains ends with a massive explosion which kills hundreds of people, including children attending a nearby school. As depicted in the Civil War crossover and series, the public outcry that follows this event leads the government (with the support of Iron Man and fellow Illuminati member Reed Richards) to quickly enact the Superhuman Registration Act (SHRA), 6 U.S.C. § 558, which required those with naturally occurring superhuman abilities, super abilities acquired through science or magic (including extraterrestrials and gods), and even non-super powered humans using exotic technology, such as Iron Man, to register as "living weapons of mass destruction." Enactment of the law on the federal level led to various revisions to state criminal codes (such as Chapter 40, Article 120, Section 120 of the New York Penal Code and Section 245(d) of the California Penal Code) in order to allow state and federal coordination in enforcing the law. This leads to a major schism and conflict among the superheroes, with the anti-SHRA side- regarding the Act as a violation of civil liberties- led by Captain America and the pro-SHRA side- seeing the Act as a natural evolution of the superhuman's role in the modern world to regain public trust- led by Iron Man. Eventually, Iron Man's side wins the conflict and the "Fifty State Initiative" is established.

Other countries followed America's lead and introduced their own Superhuman Registration laws.

Following the Skrull invasion and the subsequent fall from grace of Iron Man, Norman Osborn seizes control of the Initiative and SHIELD, but is prevented from getting his hand on the register (and thus the identities of most of the superhuman community) by Tony Stark when he infects the US government database with a computer virus. There is only one copy of the SHRA database, in Stark's brain, where he deleted it, piece by piece, before Osborn could get his hands on it, destroying the very information that was the focus of "Civil War" in the first place.

At the conclusion of Siege, Steve Rogers is named the new head of security of the United States and as a condition of joining, he convinces the government to repeal the Act, allowing superheroes to return to their prior activities.

MI-13 Registration Act
First raised in #1 and further detailed in #5 of Captain Britain and MI-13 (2008), the British version of registration was started during the Skrull invasion: all superheroes in the UK were drafted with immediate effect into the intelligence agency MI-13. After the invasion, the terms were stated that MI-13 would monitor and support superheroes and call on them for reasons of national defence, but would allow them semi-autonomy so they would not feel morally compromised.

Israel
Mossad assigns Sabra to Bishop's US government-sanctioned team that polices unruly mutants, in exchange for intelligence and technology so Israel can enact its own registration program.

Underage Superhuman Welfare Act

Being first hinted at by Senator Geoffrey Patrick on television about problems caused by young vigilantes,<ref>Incoming #1. Marvel Comics</ref> in Outlawed (April 2020), the destruction of Coles Academic High School due to Viv's malfunction and the simultaneous/resulting nearby public's near death experience had the U.S. government draft the Underage Superhuman Welfare Act. The Act, which they nicknamed Kamala's Law due to Kamala's courageous actions during the event, outlawed superheroes below twenty-one years of age. The Act also leads to the creation of the Child-Hero Reconnaissance and Disruption Law Enforcement (C.R.A.D.L.E.), whose commanders would prevent young people from being superheroes. An underage person can legally act as a superhero with an adult hero as sponsor.

The Act was supported by many superheroes such as Spider-Man (Peter Parker), as well as parents of young superheroes.

As it turns out, the Roxxon Energy Corporation had orchestrated the Kamala's Law conspiracy behind the government's back after forming a partnership with them and the established C.R.A.D.L.E., having acquired the dragons from the War of the Realms event, through disposing high schooler Aliana Kabua, and shifting the blame on the Champions for the damage they never started. Roxxon manipulates the government to further their shady businesses, such as for permanent imprisonment, brainwashing and unethical experimentation, as well as possibly kidnapping kids who oppose the unjust law. Thankfully, Viv, who survived Roxxon’s assault on Aliana and unknowingly sold her friends' freedom to C.R.A.D.L.E. and Roxxon, exposes the shady activity records within C.R.A.D.L.E. facility to the world including the U.S. government, thanks to Brawn/Amadeus Cho. With support from Champions and a group of protestors, the U.S. government end their partnership with Roxxon, and re-evaluating much more legal laws

Marvel Media

Ultimate Universe
Although no Registration Act exists in the Ultimate Marvel Universe, there are several laws in place that prohibit superhuman activity. Genetic modification of a human being is illegal, and the Superhuman Test Ban Treaty makes it illegal for nations to employ superhumans. This makes the Test Ban Treaty the polar opposite of the SHRA. In Ultimate Six #1, it was stated that the law on deliberately created superhumans is still unclear, allowing Nick Fury to hold supervillains indefinitely without any trial and in hidden locations (#5 showed that the President of the United States was unaware of this, and was furious when he learned of it).

Exiles #12
In Exiles #12 a parallel world is shown, similar to the "Days of Future Past" timeline, in which the passing of a Mutant Registration Act led to the Sentinels taking over the world and herding mutants, superhumans and eventually even humans into concentration camps.

The "Age of Apocalypse" version of Sabretooth, who at that point was a member of the Exiles, stays on this planet in order to raise the infant David Richards (the son of the Rachel Summers and Franklin Richards of that reality).

Marvel Knights: 2099
In an alternate world (Earth-2992) shown in the Marvel Knights: 2099 series of one-shots published in November 2004, a Mutant Registration Act is in effect which mandates that mutants undergo a process which robs them of their abilities.

The Marvel Knights: Mutant 2099 one-shot explained that after the passage of this act the Avengers, X-Men and Fantastic Four opposed the government's enforcement of it and were eventually defeated in a major battle that was fought in front of the Baxter Building. This led all the remaining superheroes to go underground.

The 1992 X-Men animated series
The first episode of the 1992 TV series X-Men: The Animated Series (Night of the Sentinels (part 1); original airdate: 31 October 1992) mentions that some form of registration is in effect already. In the episode, Jubilee's foster parents worry that they may have to "register her with the Mutant Control Agency" after she manifests her powers for the first time.

But following the attack on Jubilee at a mall, it was revealed that the hidden agenda of Henry Peter Gyrich, the founder of the agency is to deceive the mutants into revealing their identities so the Sentinels could track down and eliminate them due to Gyrich's beliefs that mutants pose a threat to society. After the destruction of their files, following the X-Men's raid on the agency, the President decides to cancel the registration act. The government's persecution of mutants is a consistent theme throughout the fifth season of the series.

The X-Men movies
The events of the first X-Men film are precipitated when Senator Robert Kelly introduces a Mutant Registration Act to the Senate. This motivates Magneto, who sees such legislation as persecutory towards mutants, to kidnap Kelly and replace him with Mystique, who while impersonating Kelly, withdraws his advocacy for the Act.

In the sequel, X2, the Mutant Registration Act is briefly mentioned when Storm speculates that Nightcrawler's attack on the White House might lead the government to reintroduce the legislation.

Marvel Cinematic Universe
In Captain America: Civil War (2016), public opinion of the Avengers and all superpowered beings worsens following the events of The Avengers, Captain America: The Winter Soldier, and Avengers: Age of Ultron, causing great destruction and casualties to New York City, Washington, D.C., and Sokovia, respectively. The Inhuman Outbreak in Agents of S.H.I.E.L.D. makes the situation worse. After a catastrophe in Lagos involving Wanda Maximoff using her powers to try and divert an explosion from Brock Rumlow and inadvertently causing the accidental destruction of a building and the deaths of several humanitarian workers (several of them Wakandan), the United Nations begins trying to pass a set of internationally ratified legal documents which provide regulation of the military/law enforcement deployment of enhanced individuals, particularly the Avengers, and are called the Sokovia Accords. The document's full title is the Sokovia Accords: Framework for the Registration and Deployment of Enhanced Individuals. The Accords divide the Avengers, leading Steve Rogers to come into conflict with Tony Stark, with Stark believing the Avengers need to be held responsible for their actions, especially after he created Ultron and was responsible for the destruction in Sokovia, and Rogers believing the Accords will restrict the Avengers' freedom and therefore opposing it.

In the meantime, Bucky Barnes is framed for a bombing at the UN by Colonel Helmut Zemo, who uses the Accords to his advantage against the Avengers, seeking vengeance for the deaths of his family in Sokovia. This leads to Rogers and Stark each forming their own sides as they battle over the Accords, ultimately resulting in a large-scale battle at the Leipzig/Halle Airport, with Stark, James Rhodes, Peter Parker, Romanoff, T'Challa and Vision against Rogers, Barnes, Sam Wilson, Clint Barton, Maximoff, and Scott Lang. The battle concludes with Rogers and Barnes escaping to the Hydra Siberian Facility, where they suspect Zemo will unleash five other Winter Soldiers. In the aftermath of the battle, Wilson, Maximoff, Barton and Lang are imprisoned at the Raft, while Romanoff becomes a fugitive and goes into hiding for helping Rogers and Barnes escape. Rogers and Romanoff break their allies out of the Raft, with Stark choosing not to interfere after reading a letter from Rogers.

In Avengers: Infinity War (2018), Ross still intends to prosecute Rogers, Romanoff, Wilson, and Maximoff for violating the Accords, despite being made aware of Zemo's actions and the threat that Thanos poses to Earth. This alienates Rhodes, who no longer supports the useless Accords, and he proceeds to hang up on Ross instead of arresting them as ordered, leading Rhodes to get court-martialed. Clint Barton and Scott Lang are unavailable for the battle against Thanos because they are on house arrest for violating the Accords.

In Ant-Man and the Wasp (2018), Lang is under house arrest as part of his plea deal, while Hope van Dyne and her father Hank Pym were forced into hiding for violation of the Accords due to their technology being involved in the conflict.

In WandaVision (2021), FBI agent Jimmy Woo suggests that Maximoff violated the Accords when she reactivated Vision. However, it is eventually revealed that the surveillance footage showing this was doctored by S.W.O.R.D. acting director Tyler Hayward.

In Black Widow (2021), which is set in 2016, Romanoff continues to be on the run from Ross for violating the Accords during her crusade to take down the Red Room.

In the She-Hulk: Attorney at Law (2022) episode "Ribbit and Rip It", when Jennifer Walters requests that superhero tailor Luke Jacobson reveal his list of clients to the court, his attorney Matt Murdock states that the Sokovia Accords had been repealed, thus negating the need to reveal his client list.

Avengers Assemble
In Avengers Assemble, two registration acts are enacted: "the New Powers Act" which puts all super powered beings under government jurisdiction and a variation of the Mutant Registration Act known as Inhumans Registration Act which puts all Inhumans under government control with Registration Disks on their necks. Both the "New Powers Act" and the Inhuman Registration Act, however, are revealed to be just a plot by Ultron (who was disguised as the Avengers' government liaison Truman Marsh) to accomplish his goals against both humans and Inhumans, also revealing that the Registration Disks are mind control devices.

Marvel Future Avengers
In a three-part story during the first season of Marvel Future Avengers, Norman Osborn uses a mind-altering gas as the Green Goblin to cause the Hulk to go on a rampage in New York City, stoking anti-superhero sentiment. Osborn uses this to gain support for a new superhero regulation bill, hoping to eliminate superheroes from society and allow him to sow chaos. The law passes, but several councilmen begin seeking its repeal, leading the Green Goblin to stage violent attacks on the bill's opponents. Ultimately, Spider-Man and the Future Avengers expose Osborn as the Green Goblin, and he is defeated and imprisoned, restoring the people's faith in heroes and leading to the law's repeal.

DC Universe

DC Comics
In DC Comics, DC Universe the Justice Society of America chose to disband in 1951 rather than appear before the U.S. House Un-American Activities Committee, which demands they publicly unmask themselves. This was first shown in Adventure Comics (vol. 1) #466 ("The Defeat of the Justice Society!"; December 1979) by writer Paul Levitz and subsequently further explored in the America vs. The Justice Society 4 issue limited series (January–April 1985) by writers Roy and Dann Thomas.

There is also a piece of legislation called the "Keene Act" (an apparent reference to Watchmen, see below) in the DC Universe. First mentioned in Suicide Squad (vol. 1) #1 (May 1987) in a story written by John Ostrander, the "Act" is referred to as a piece of legislation from 1961 which gives prisons greater leeway in imprisoning superhumans than ordinary prisoners.

It was more fully explored in Secret Origins (vol. 3) #14 (May 1987), again written by Ostrander, where it is revealed that the Act was passed in 1961 and it reaffirmed the right (that had been cast into doubt by HUAC in 1951) of superheroes to operate with secret identities. That story also reveals that the later "Ingersoll Amendment" (a reference to lawyer and comics writer Bob Ingersoll) to the Keene Act, which delineates governmental authority over superhuman activity in times of crisis, was passed into law in 1972.

Watchmen
In Alan Moore and Dave Gibbons' 12 issue Watchmen series (September 1986 – October 1987), extensive reference is made to a law called the Keene Act.

The series reveals that the actions of superheroes or "costumed vigilantes" in the world of Watchmen caused a New York City police strike in 1977, which led to rioting (shown in Watchmen #2; October 1986) and the passing of the Keene Act which outlaws non-government affiliated acts of "costumed adventuring" (mentioned in Watchmen #4; December 1986).

The passing of the act led to the retirement of most of the US superheroes, the sole exceptions being government-sponsored heroes such as The Comedian and Doctor Manhattan (who are used to fight wars, allowing the US to win the Vietnam War) and Rorschach, who refuses to abide by the law. The series depicts them coming out of retirement when The Comedian is murdered at the beginning of the comic.

DC Media
Smallville
In the television series Smallville The Vigilante Registrations Act (VRA) is proposed legislation that would require vigilantes to register themselves. Led by General Slade Wilson, the VRA forces registered heroes to unmask and officially work for the government or be branded as terrorists. Despite the efforts of Darkseid and his minions to encourage anti-hero propaganda, the actions of the Justice League, Oliver Queen, and the pro-vigilante Senator Martha Kent – ironically aided by an assassination attempt arranged against Martha by a clone of Lex Luthor, which was based around his personal grudges against her son rather than the VRA – result in the Act being repealed and the heroes being permitted to return to their daily lives.

Batman v Superman: Dawn of Justice
In the film Batman v Superman: Dawn of Justice, the character of Superman becomes controversial due to his unintentional hand in the destruction wreaked in Metropolis as a result of General Zod's invasion during Man of Steel. The government subsequently decides to have a court hearing that will decide if Superman should be held accountable via a registration act. A conflicted Superman tries to avoid it, and instead focus on trying to locate Batman, who agrees with the government and desires to obtain kryptonite to use on him if necessary. Superman ultimately attends the hearing, but before a resolution can be made, Lex Luthor bombs the court.

Other equivalents
In many other super-hero universes the government has intervened to regulate or control the activities of super-heroes. Some examples of this include:

The Return of Captain Invincible
In the 1983 comedy film The Return of Captain Invincible starring Alan Arkin and Christopher Lee, Captain Invincible (Arkin) is a super-hero who was forced into retirement in the 1950s following the government's persecution of him.

In a similar scenario as that faced by the Justice Society, Captain Invincible faced a McCarthy-ish congressional investigation which accused him of being a communist (because of his red cape) and charged him for violating U.S. airspace by flying without a proper license.

As the title suggests a crisis forces Captain Invincible out of retirement in the 1980s which leads to him redeeming his reputation.

City of Heroes
Following World War II, in the City of Heroes universe, the United States intelligence community feared the Soviet bloc would gain an advantage in meta-human assets. To address this issue, the government passed the Might for Right Act. This law proclaimed any U.S. citizen with meta-human powers or paranormal abilities, super-powered individuals and vigilante heroes a valuable national resource subject to draft without notice into the service of the United States government.

The law was later struck down by the U.S. Supreme Court after numerous protests and complaints regarding the law's civil rights abuses.

Currently in effect in the setting is the Citizen Crime Fighting Act, which provides vigilantes who choose to register (whether technically superhuman or not) with police powers. Unlike the Might for Right act or the Marvel act the CCFA does not require heroes to work for the government, although through various "forms" in the game it is shown the government (or at least the one in Paragon City) keeps track of all heroes and any supergroups they may form.

Similar to Marvel's 2006 Act, in the alternate dimension Praetoria all superhumans are required to work under the "Powers Division" of the government.

Astro City
In writer Kurt Busiek's Astro City Vol. 2 #6-9 (February - May 1996) the registration of super-humans is mandated by the city's Mayor Stevenson. In those comic book issues, a super-human serial killer is thought to be active in the city and the Mayor proposes that registration will help apprehend the killer.

Stevenson brings in federal E.A.G.L.E. agents to enforce the new requirement, which is opposed by many active super-heroes. The prominent hero Winged Victory makes outspoken statements opposing registration and several super-humans flout the law and illegally continue their activities without registration.

In Astro City #8 the Mayor is revealed as an alien infiltrator whose actions are part of a planned extraterrestrial invasion. The mayor's policy discredited,  Astro City's super-human population unite to defeat the invasion in Astro City #9.

Registration is abandoned at the storyline's conclusion and has not been mentioned again in the series. The issues involved were later collected in the trade paperback Astro City: Confession.

Brave New World
In the Brave New World superhero role-playing game originally released by Pinnacle Entertainment Group in 1999 the setting of a dystopian alternate timeline includes a fascist United States government which passed the "Delta Registration Act" after a group of supervillains attempted to assassinate President John F. Kennedy on November 22, 1963.

In the game the law requires that anybody with super-human abilities must register themselves to the United States Government. Its restrictive provisions include requirements that registrants surrender certain civil rights and notify the police of their whereabouts regularly. The law also mandates that super-powered individuals register within 7 days of first manifesting their abilities, with the penalty for failing to do so being an automatic sentence of life imprisonment without the possibility of parole. The Act also legislates for the mandatory military conscription of individual super-powered individuals at any time should their abilities be judged necessary by the government. In the world of the game most other nations have similar laws, though they are far less draconian in their restrictions and enforcement.

Powers
In Brian Michael Bendis and Michael Avon Oeming's Powers series, superheroes had to register with the government in order to be able to operate. This was changed following the events of Powers (vol. 1) #30 (March 2003) in which Super Shock, the world's most trusted superhero, goes on a massive worldwide killing spree. At that point, the US government prohibited super-beings from using their powers and operating as superheroes.

This leads all the world's heroes to retire and attempt to live normal lives, though after Powers (vol. 2) #6 (November 2004) some begin to re-emerge.

The Incredibles and Incredibles 2
In the world depicted in the 2004 Pixar animated feature film The Incredibles, superheroes (known as "supers") are shown in flashbacks as originally having been required to register with the National Supers Agency (or "NSA"; a joke reference to the real-life National Security Agency) in order to legally fight the crime that mostly (and at many times constantly) occurred in their home city of Municiberg during the late 1940s and into the 50s.

However, this all changed when the Sansweet v. Incredible court case at the start of the film revealed superheroes are legally liable for personal injury claims of people injured during their activities, eventually revealing they are also liable for costs to infrastructure and property damaged during their activities. Despite any and all of the important live-saving and crime-stopping those same activities had and would provide for everyone, the superheroes ended up facing potentially overwhelming legal liabilities for those injuries and damages, and public pressure from those who hated superheroes for causing any and/or all of them: this forced all superheroes into retirement before the end of the 1950s. To assist them with these retirement processes, the United States government set up a "Superhero Relocation Program" (similar in many ways to the non-fictional Witness Protection Program) which granted superheroes amnesty from the legal claims provided they permanently retire from hero work and live anonymously.

By the end of the movie, in the Early 1960s (1962 according to a newspaper), the main protagonists have returned to their roles as superheroes (among the very few left as the result of the villainous Syndrome's actions), hinting the program itself has been nullified.

In the 2018 sequel, Incredibles 2, the shutdown of the relocation program is confirmed, after the main protagonists' first attempt at resuming their hero work unfortunately reveals that much of the public and government still does not want them back, thus leading to said shutdown. A wealthy industrialist, Winston Deavor, recruits Helen Parr (Elastigirl and wife of Robert Parr, Mr. Incredible) to help him get supers legalized again. Although the effort is sabotaged by Deavor's own sister Evelyn, who blames supers for the cause of their father's death, near the end of the film, a judge is shown striking down the legislation outlawing superheroes.

Absolution
In the world depicted in Absolution'', Christopher Gage's creator-owned limited series by Avatar Press, super heroes are part of the police force. While the government is aware of their real identities, superheroes are not obligated to reveal their identities to the public.

References

External links
The Annotated JSA checklist: Timeline 1950
Doug Atkinson's The Annotated Watchmen
The Grand Comics Database

Science fiction themes
Discrimination in fiction
X-Men
Political fiction
Tropes
Superhero fiction themes